Edith Renfrow Smith (born July 14, 1914) is an American woman who was the first African American woman to graduate from Grinnell College, in Grinnell, Iowa. The granddaughter of slaves, Edith at age 108 was designated a "superager" in a study by Northwestern University for her remarkable memory and longevity. At the age of 108, she was given an honorary degree from Grinnell College. There are also two spaces on the campus named in her honor. As of February 2023, Edith is still living in Chicago.

Early life and family history 
Born on July 14, 1914, Edith Renfrow was the fifth of six children of Eva Craig and Lee Augustus Renfrow. The Renfrows were one of the few African American families in the community of Grinnell, a small rural town in central Iowa. Both Eva Craig and Lee Renfrow's parents had been slaves and were born into slavery. Lee's father, Perry Renfrow, was born into slavery in North Carolina. His mother, Elia (sometimes Alice) Anderson, was born in Gambia and brought to the Americas as a slave.

NAACP article in "The Crisis" 
The story of Eva's mother, Eliza Jane, is told in a 1937 article in the NAACP publication The Crisis, entitled "Up from Slavery," written at the time of Edith's graduation from Grinnell College by Professor Milton Wittler. Edith tells the story of her grandmother, Eliza Jane, and the French man who fell in love with her when she was his slave. Edith is quoted as saying, "[he] made her mistress of his house, treating her with honor and affection. When children came he accepted them as his own and gave them every advantage, even planning for their complete education by a clause in his will." She tells the story of her grandparents sending their children north at the time their father grew ill, making arrangements to pay for their lodging and schooling. When he urged his wife to go with them, she refused to leave. 

Edith continued the story by telling of how her grandmother was forced back into slavery: "For on the death of her master, his brothers, who had no patience with his ideas, burned my grandmother's writ of freedom before her eyes and forced her back into slavery, dividing their brother's estate among themselves."  

The article tells how Eliza Jane was raised by Quakers in Ohio and later Iowa, where she met and married George Craig. Their daughter, Eva Pearl Craig, would marry Lee Augustus Renfrow and raise the six Renfrow children in Grinnell.

Siblings 
Eldest sibling Helen Renfrow Lemme (1904-1968) became a celebrated educator and civil rights advocate in Iowa City, Iowa. The Helen Lemme Elementary School in Iowa City is named in her honor. She is also among those listed on the Grinnell High School Alumni Hall of Fame. 

Alice Renfrow (1906-1997) attended Hampton University and went on to a career at the Library of Congress. 

Rudolph Renfrow (1907-1972) graduated as valedictorian of his class at Hampton and was a part of the New Negro Alliance in Washington, D.C. in the 1930s. 

Evanel Renfrow (1908-1994)  received a Bachelors and Master's degree in nutrition from the University of Iowa. She became a professor at Savannah State University.

The youngest, Paul Renfrow (1916-1974), served in the US Army during World War II and was part of the D-Day invasion, reaching the rank of Master Sergeant before his discharge. He attended optician school and practiced in Washington, D.C.

Education 

Education was a priority in the Renfrow family, and all the children attended college and later had careers. Edith, like most of the other Renfrow children, completed her public school education in Grinnell. She was the only one to stay in town and attend Grinnell College. She graduated in 1937 with a major in psychology and a minor in economics. She was the first African American woman to graduate from Grinnell College. 

A student during the depression, she worked a number of campus jobs and lived and ate her meals at home to save money. Despite the living arrangement, she was able to participate in the campus community. In a 2007 article in the Grinnell Magazine, she is quoted as saying "That was a wonderful experience. I was just part of the group, and I enjoyed all the group activities that we had at Grinnell."  She attended dances and dinners along with the other female students. She also played sports, including basketball and field hockey.

Career 
After college, Edith moved to Chicago in search of work. There she worked at the YWCA and later the University of Chicago. In Chicago she met Henry T. Smith and on May 25, 1940 the couple was married in the Renfrow home in Grinnell. They had two children, Virginia and Alice. She earned her teaching license and taught in the Chicago school system for 21 years. After retirement in 1976, she started to volunteer regularly at Goodwill and the Art Institute of Chicago, something she continued into her nineties.

Later life and honors 
In 2009, at the age of 94, Edith was admitted to the Chicago Senior Citizen Hall of Fame and was the 2009 Luminary Award Recipient for her many years of community involvement.  Because of her remarkable vitality and memory, at the age of 99, Edith was selected to be a part of a "superager" study being conducted by Northwestern University. To qualify as a "superager," a person must be "age 80 or older with memory performance equal to or even better than healthy people in their 50s and 60s. To qualify, an individual must pass a rigorous set of memory tests, ones so tough that less than 10 percent of people who believe they could be a SuperAger actually qualify." In 2018, Edith appeared on the Today Show as a part of their series on superagers. In 2021, she appeared in a PBS produced piece entitled "Build a Better Memory through Science" that broadcast on some stations and is available to stream online.  

In 2019, at the age of 104, Edith received an honorary degree from Grinnell College. Earlier that year the Edith Renfrow Smith Black Women's Library was opened in the Grinnell College Black Cultural Center. In 2006, she had been honored by the school in the naming of the Smith Gallery in the Joe Rosenfield Campus Center. 

The Chicago Sun-Times did a two-part feature on Edith when she turned 107 in July, 2021. They did another piece on her when she turned 108.  

In 2022, Grinnell College announced their new Civic Engagement Quad residential hall building would be named Renfrow Hall in honor of Edith Renfrow Smith.

She was featured in a piece, "She was an education pioneer. At 108, Edith Renfrow Smith shares her life lessons," on the NBC News website in February 2023.

She was featured in an NPR Weekend Edition interview with Scott Simon, "Meet the woman who has witnessed over 100 years of Black history in Chicago", broadcast on Feb. 11, 2023.

Additional resources 
 Grinnell Historical Museum created an exhibit on Early African Americans which featured several of the Renfrow family members. Read about the exhibit here: https://www.desmoinesregister.com/story/news/local/grinnell/2017/02/07/focus-african-american-family-early-grinnell/97586050/
 Edith Smith: a Century of Life, The Scarlet & Black, October 8, 2015
 Video of Interview at Drake Community Library in 2015, at the age of 101.
 Podcast: Interview when receiving Honorary degree from Grinnell College https://allthingsgrinnell.podbean.com/e/edith-renfrow-smith-37/

Further reading 
The stories of the Renfrow family members are explored in the book "Grinnell Stories: African Americans of Early Grinnell" by Dan Kaiser, published in 2020 by the Grinnell Historical Museum.

A website created by Grinnell College expands on research done into Edith's life. "Through the eyes of a pioneer: Living history with Edith Renfrow Smith '37, Grinnell College's First Black Alumna" was created by Dr. Tamara Beauboeuf-Lafontant as a result of multiple interviews with and research into Edith Renfrow Smith's life.  

A webpage created by Drake Community Library provides an overview of her life and family history. The information is also available as a pdf here.

References 

1914 births
Living people
20th-century African-American people
20th-century African-American women
21st-century African-American people
21st-century African-American women
African-American centenarians
American centenarians
Grinnell College alumni
Women centenarians